Robert Beatty (1909–1992) was a Canadian actor.

Robert Beatty may also refer to:

Robert Beatty (artist) (born 1981), American artist and musician
Robert Beatty (Dean of Ardfert) (died 1921), Irish priest
Robert Beatty (Archdeacon of Ardagh) (1821–1891), English clergyman
Robert Beatty (author), American tech entrepreneur and author
Robert Beatty, Irish settler and namesake of Beatty Lake (Minnesota)
Bob Beatty (born 1955), American football coach

See also
Robert Beattie (disambiguation)